Myopites is a genus of tephritid  or fruit flies in the family Tephritidae.

Species
Species within this genus include:
Myopites apicatus Freidberg, 1980
Myopites boghariensis Séguy, 1934
Myopites bonifaciae Dirlbek, 1973
Myopites cypriacus Hering, 1938
Myopites delottoi (Munro, 1955)
Myopites eximia Séguy, 1932
Myopites hemixanthus (Munro, 1931)
Myopites inulaedyssentericae Blot, 1827
Myopites lelea Dirlbek, 1973
Myopites longirostris (Loew, 1846)
Myopites nigrescens Becker, 1908
Myopites olii Dirlbek, 1973
Myopites orientalis Korneyev, 1987
Myopites stylatus (Fabricius, 1794)
Myopites tenellus Frauenfeld, 1863
Myopites variofasciatus Becker, 1903
Myopites zernyi Hering, 1939

References

Tephritinae
Tephritidae genera